Daejeonia is a Gram-negative and strictly aerobic genus of bacteria from the family of Flavobacteriaceae with one known species (Daejeonia ginsenosidivorans).

References

Flavobacteria
Bacteria genera
Monotypic bacteria genera
Taxa described in 2017